Manuel Larraín Errazuriz (born 1900 in Santiago) was a Chilean clergyman and bishop for the Roman Catholic Diocese of Talca. He was ordained in 1927. He was appointed bishop in 1938. He died in 1966.

References 

1900 births
1966 deaths
Chilean Roman Catholic bishops
Roman Catholic bishops of Talca